Riccardo Fois (born 19 February 1987) is an Italian professional basketball coach and former player. He is the assistant coach of the Arizona of the Pac-12 Conference (Pac-12). He played prep basketball at Boaz High School (Boaz, AL) while in the exchange student program and later went onto play college basketball for the Pepperdine Waves.

Playing career 
When Fois first moved to the United States, he played the 2007-08 season at Pepperdine and was named to the WCC Commissioner’s Honor Roll.

Fois played professionally in Italian 3rd-tier Serie B from 2009–2012. He played for Robur Basket Osimo and Pallacanestro Firenze.

National team career 
Fois was a member of the Italy national under-16 team at the 2003 European Championship for Cadets in Madrid, Spain. Over six tournament games, he averaged 0.8 points and 0.8 rebounds per game.

Coaching career
Fois served as a graduate assistant for the men’s basketball program at Pepperdine University from 2012 to 2014.

Fois worked for the Gonzaga University men’s basketball program for five seasons (2014–2019), elevating to the title of director of analytics. In this role, he handled video breakdown and exchange, evaluated player analytics and assisted the coaching staff with day-to-day program operations. The Bulldogs advanced at least as far as the Sweet 16 of the NCAA tournament in all five of Fois' seasons, and he helped the program reach its first-ever Final Four in 2017, played in Glendale, Arizona, when Gonzaga finished as national runner-up.

Fois assisted Gonzaga's head coach Mark Few as the video coordinator for the United States national team coached by Few that won the bronze medal at the 2015 Pan American Games in Toronto, Canada. Fois was an assistant coach for the Italian national team during the 2017 FIBA EuroBasket championship, serving on the staff of Ettore Messina.

On June 26, 2019, Fois was hired as a player development coach for the Phoenix Suns.

Personal life 
Fois earned his bachelor's degree in integrated marketing communication from the Pepperdine University in 2008 and earned his master's degree in business administration from Pepperdine in 2014.

See also
 List of foreign NBA coaches

References

External links 
 
 Player profile at eurobasket.com
 Coach profile at eurobasket.com

1987 births
Living people
Italian basketball coaches
Italian expatriate basketball people in the United States
Pepperdine Waves men's basketball players
Phoenix Suns assistant coaches
Shooting guards